Richard Jefferies  (born 26 February 1987) is a British sprint canoeist. Born in Bembridge, Isle of Wight he competed in the Men's C-1 200 metres and C-1 1000 metres at the 2012 Summer Olympics.

References

English male canoeists
1987 births
Living people
Olympic canoeists of Great Britain
Canoeists at the 2012 Summer Olympics
Sportspeople from the Isle of Wight
British male canoeists